Andrei Sapozhnikov (born June 15, 1971) is a Russian former ice hockey defenceman. He is currently working as an assistant coach for HC Vityaz of the Kontinental Hockey League (KHL).

Sapozhnikov played in the Soviet Hockey League and the Russian Superleague for Traktor Chelyabinsk, Metallurg Magnitogorsk, Severstal Cherepovets, Khimik Voskresensk, Avangard Omsk and Vityaz Chekhov. He also played in Italy's Serie A for HC Fassa and Germany's Deutsche Eishockey Liga for the Wedemark Scorpions.

Sapozhnikov was drafted 129th overall by the Boston Bruins in the 1993 NHL Entry Draft and had a brief spell with the Bruins organization in the 1994-95 season, playing nineteen games for their American Hockey League affiliate the Providence Bruins. Sapozhnikov was also a member of the Russia national team for the 1993 IIHF World Championship.

He was inducted into the Russian and Soviet Hockey Hall of Fame in 1993.

External links
 Russian and Soviet Hockey Hall of Fame bio

1971 births
Living people
Avangard Omsk players
Boston Bruins draft picks
SHC Fassa players
HC Khimik Voskresensk players
HC Mechel players
Metallurg Magnitogorsk players
Providence Bruins players
Russian ice hockey defencemen
Severstal Cherepovets players
Soviet ice hockey defencemen
Sportspeople from Chelyabinsk
Traktor Chelyabinsk players
HC Vityaz players
Wedemark Scorpions players